A solar calendar is a calendar whose dates indicate the season or almost equivalently the apparent position of the Sun relative to the stars. The Gregorian calendar, widely accepted as a standard in the world, is an example of a solar calendar.
The main other type of calendar is a lunar calendar, whose months correspond to cycles of Moon phases. The months of the Gregorian calendar do not correspond to cycles of the Moon phase.

The Egyptians appear to have been the first to develop a solar calendar, using as a fixed point the annual sunrise reappearance of the Dog Star—Sirius, or Sothis—in the eastern sky, which coincided with the annual flooding of the Nile River. They constructed a calendar of 365 days, consisting of 12 months of 30 days each, with 5 days added at the year’s end. The Egyptians’ failure to account for the extra fraction of a day, however, caused their calendar to drift gradually into error.

Examples
The oldest solar calendars include the Julian calendar and the Coptic calendar. 
They both have a year of 365 days, which is extended to 366 once every four years, without exception, so have a mean year of 365.25 days.
As solar calendars became more accurate, they evolved into two types.

Tropical solar calendars

If the position of the Earth in its orbit around the Sun is reckoned with respect to the Equinox, the point at which the orbit crosses the celestial equator, then its dates accurately indicate the seasons, that is, they are synchronized with the declination of the Sun. Such a calendar is called a tropical solar calendar .

The duration of the mean calendar year of such a calendar approximates some form of the tropical year, usually either the mean tropical year or the vernal equinox year.

The following are tropical solar calendars:
Ancient Armenian calendar
Gregorian calendar
Bengali calendar (National and official calendar in Bangladesh)
Iranian calendar (Jalāli calendar)
Tabarian calendar (Tabarian calendar)
Indian national calendar (Saka calendar)

Every one of these calendars has a year of 365 days, which is occasionally extended by adding an extra day to form a leap year, a method called "intercalation", the inserted day being "intercalary".

The Baháʼí calendar, another example of a solar calendar, always begins the year on the vernal equinox and sets its intercalary days so that the following year also begins on the vernal equinox. The moment of the vernal equinox in the northern hemisphere is determined using the location of Tehran "by means of astronomical computations from reliable sources".

Sidereal solar calendars

If the position of the Earth (see above) is reckoned with respect to the fixed stars, then the dates indicate the zodiacal constellation near which the Sun can be found. A calendar of this type is called a sidereal solar calendar.

The mean calendar year of such a calendar approximates the sidereal year.

Leaping from one lunation to another, but one Sidereal year is the period between two occurrences of the sun, as measured by the stars' solar calendar, which is derived from the Earth's orbit around the sun every 28 years.

Indian calendars like the Hindu calendar, Tamil calendar, Bengali calendar (non-revised) and Malayalam calendar are sidereal solar calendars. The Thai solar calendar when based on the Hindu solar calendar was also a sidereal calendar. They are calculated on the basis of the apparent motion of the Sun through the twelve zodiacal signs rather than the tropical movement of the Earth.

Non-solar calendars

The Islamic calendar, which is a purely lunar calendar and has a year, whose start drifts through the seasons and so is not a solar calendar.
The Maya Tzolkin calendar, which follows a 260-day cycle, has no year, therefore it is not a solar calendar.
Also, any calendar synchronized only to the synodic period of Venus would not be solar.

Lunisolar calendars

Lunisolar calendars are lunar calendars that have additional intercalation rules to roughly synchronize the solar year and the seasons. Typical lunisolar calendars have years marked with a whole number of lunar months, so they can not indicate the position of Earth relative to the Sun with the same accuracy as a purely solar calendar.

List of solar calendars 
The following is a list of current, historical, and proposed solar calendars:

 Assamese calendar
 Assyrian calendar
 Astronomical year numbering 
 Badí‘ calendar 
 Basotho calendar
 Bengali calendar 
 Berber calendar 
 Bulgar calendar
 Byzantine calendar
 Caesar's Calendar
 Coptic calendar
 Discordian calendar 
 Era Fascista 
 Ethiopian calendar 
 Florentine calendar 
 French Republican Calendar
 Gregorian calendar 
 Hanke-Henry Permanent Calendar 
 Holocene calendar
 Indian national calendar
 International Fixed Calendar 
 Invariable Calendar  
 Jalali calendar
 Javanese calendar
 Juche era calendar  
 Julian calendar
 Malayalam calendar 
 Minguo calendar 
 Nanakshahi calendar
 Odia calendar 
 Old Icelandic calendar 
 Pancronometer
 Pataphysical calendar
 Pax Calendar 
 Pentecontad calendar
 Pisan calendar 
 Positivist calendar
 Revised Julian calendar 
 Roman calendar 
 Runic calendar 
 Solar Hijri calendar
 Soviet calendar
 Swedish calendar 
 Symmetry454 
 Tamil calendar 
 Thai solar calendar 
 Tulu calendar 
 World Calendar 
 World Season Calendar

See also
List of calendars
Analemma calendar
Astronomical clock
Daytime (astronomy)

References

External links

Correspondence between Hebrew and Islamic calendars, months and holidays (pdf)